DreamWorks Animation Television (abbreviated as DWATV or simply DAT) is an American animation studio that serves as the television production arm of DreamWorks Animation, itself a subsidiary of Universal Pictures and a division of Comcast's NBCUniversal. Founded in 1996, the entity was formerly named DreamWorks Television Animation. Its first programs from the 1990s and early 2000s used the live-action television logo, and were produced by DreamWorks Television, before DWATV and its parent company were spun off into an independent company in 2004 and later purchased by NBCUniversal in 2016. In total, the division has released 51 programs, with 9 in development.

History 
The company was first formed in 1996 as the animation division of DreamWorks Television, a subsidiary of the main DreamWorks studio. The TV division was spearheaded by Jeffrey Katzenberg and Steven Spielberg and was headed by former Walt Disney Television Animation executives Gary Krisel and David Simon. DWTA only produced two series: Invasion America and Toonsylvania. In a move to consolidate, DreamWorks Television Animation was shut down in 1999 as well as the direct-to-video subsidiary merged with the studio's feature animation division, as a way for the company to reorganize its animation divisions to operate under one umbrella. More than two-thirds of the TV division's 50 employees were transferred to the direct-to-video unit and it was expected that only a minimal number of employees were be affected by the reorganization.

In 2013, DreamWorks Animation entered a multi-year content deal with Netflix to provide 300 hours of exclusive original content. The intent of the deal was to establish a reliable income for the studio to defray the financial risk of solely relying on the theatrical film market. The next day, DWA completed a five-year licensing agreement with Super RTL for the Classic Media library and the Netflix slate. DWA announced executive hiring for its new television group, DreamWorks Animation Television in late July. Former Nickelodeon senior executive Margie Cohn became Head of Television for the group. In September that same year, DreamWorks announced that it has acquired the TV library of London-based Chapman Entertainment with the programs to distributed through DWA's UK-based TV distribution operation.

In late 2014, DreamWorks Animation launched its own channel called the DreamWorks Channel. DreamWorks made a deal with HBO Asia to handle affiliate sales, marketing and technical services, the network will launch in several Asian countries (excluding China and Japan) in the second half of 2015. The channel first premiered in English on August 1, 2015, and a Thai-dubbed channel launched in September 2015. In 2016, DreamWorks Animation Television and its parent company were purchased by Comcast through its NBCUniversal division.

Television series

Released

Upcoming

Films

Television specials

Notes

See also
 List of Universal Television programs
 List of Universal Animation Studios productions

References

External links 
 

1996 establishments in California
Companies formerly listed on the New York Stock Exchange
American animation studios
Television production companies of the United States
Companies based in Glendale, California
American companies established in 1996
Mass media companies established in 1996
Steven Spielberg
DreamWorks Animation
Universal Pictures
NBCUniversal
2016 mergers and acquisitions
Corporate spin-offs
American corporate subsidiaries
Jeffrey Katzenberg
David Geffen